This is a list of airports in Zambia, sorted by location.

Zambia, officially the Republic of Zambia, is a landlocked country in Southern Africa. The neighboring countries are the Democratic Republic of the Congo to the north, Tanzania to the northeast, Malawi to the east, Mozambique, Zimbabwe, Botswana and Namibia to the south, and Angola to the west.

Zambia is divided into ten provinces. The capital city is Lusaka.



Airports 
Airport names shown in bold indicate the airport has scheduled service on commercial airlines.

See also 

 Department of Civil Aviation of Zambia
 Transport in Zambia
 List of Zambian airports by ICAO code
 Wikipedia: WikiProject Aviation/Airline destination lists: Africa#Zambia

References 
 
  - includes IATA codes
 Great Circle Mapper: Airports in Zambia - IATA and ICAO codes

Zambia
 
Airports
Airports
Zambia